Xilingol League (also transliterated as Xilin Gol or Shiliin Gol; ; , ,) is one of the 3 leagues of Inner Mongolia. The league's economy is based on mining and agriculture.

Xilingol borders Mongolia to the north, Chifeng, Tongliao and Hinggan League to the east, Ulanqab to the west and Hebei to the south.

This is the only prefecture-level division of Inner Mongolia in whose southern border nomadic culture is still vivid. Some divisions, such as Tongliao, have a much higher percentage of Mongolian population, but agriculture is extensive among Khorchin Mongols there. Xilingol League is also the closest Inner Mongolian prefecture-level division to Beijing; although, among those Inner Mongolian prefecture-level divisions bordering Hebei, the province surrounding Beijing, Xilin Gol is also the most unapproachable one. With a significant population of Chakhar Mongols, who speak a Mongolian dialect closely related to the standard dialect of Mongolia, the dialect also spoken in Xulun Hoh Banner, Xilin Gol League's variety is chosen as the standard language of Mongolian in China. Nevertheless, the de facto common standard is a mix of Khorchin-Kharchin and Chakhar, due to the extensive presence of Khorchin Mongolian speakers in China.

Demographics 
In 2000, there were 975,168 inhabitants:

Administrative subdivisions 
Xilin Gol is divided into two county-level cities, one county and nine banners:

Demonstrations in 2011 

After the alleged murder of a Mongolian herder, Mergen, by a Chinese truck driver who was blocking the way for Chinese coal trucks to pass through his pasture on May 10, 2011.  Protests with some thousand protestors broke out in Xilingol. To prevent the spreading of protests, the Chinese government sealed off the Inner Mongolia University for Nationalities in Tongliao and the Nationalities University in Hohhot, the only two universities where lessons are predominantly taught in Mongolian. In addition, it enforced tight control on the internet and shut down QQ chatrooms.

References

External links 
 Official website 
 Official website 

Prefecture-level divisions of Inner Mongolia
Articles containing Mongolian script text